Steve Dehler (born March 21, 1950) is an American politician and businessman.

Born in St. Cloud, Minnesota, Dehler attended the College of Saint Benedict and Saint John's University where he studied accounting and economics. He was a retail grocer/correctional officer/dispatcher. He served on the St. Joseph, Minnesota city council and as mayor. From 1993 to 2002, he served in the Minnesota House of Representatives as a Republican. In 2012, he lost a primary election for Hennepin County, Minnesota commissioner. His uncle, Sylvester Uphus, and a cousin, Ken Otremba, also served in the Minnesota Legislature, the former as an Independent Republican, and the latter as a Democrat.

Notes

1950 births
Living people
Politicians from St. Cloud, Minnesota
College of Saint Benedict and Saint John's University alumni
Businesspeople from Minnesota
Minnesota city council members
Mayors of places in Minnesota
Republican Party members of the Minnesota House of Representatives
21st-century American politicians
People from St. Joseph, Minnesota